James Moncreiff may refer to:
 James Moncreiff, 1st Baron Moncreiff, Scottish lawyer and politician
 Sir James Wellwood Moncreiff, 9th Baronet, Scottish lawyer and judge